Nabarangpur (Sl. No.: 75) is a Vidhan Sabha constituency of Nabarangpur district, Odisha.

This constituency includes Nabarangpur, Nabarangpur block, Tentulikhunti block, Nandahandi block and 10 Gram panchayats (Madiagam, Chirma, Badambada, Panduguda, Kukudisemla, Rajoda, Bamuni, Sanambada, Binjili and Ukiapali) of Kosagumuda block.

Elected Members

Fifteen elections were held between 1951 and 2014.
Elected members from the Nabarangpur constituency are:

2019: (75): Sadasiva Pradhani (BJD)
2014: (75): Manohar Randhari (BJD)
2009: (75): Manohar Randhari (BJD)
2004: (90): Habibulla Khan (Congress)
2000: (90): Habibullah Khan (Congress)
1995: (90): Habibullah Khan (Congress)
1990: (90): Habibullah Khan (Congress)
1985: (90): Habibullah Khan (Congress)
1980: (90): Habibullah Khan (Congress-I)
1977: (90): Habibullah Khan (Congress)
1974: (90): Habibullah Khan (Swatantra Party)
1971: (84): Habibullah Khan (Swatantra Party)
1967: (84): Sadashiva Tripathy (Congress)
1961: (3): Miru Harijan (Congress)
1957: (2): Sadashiva Tripathy (Congress) and Miru Harijan (Congress)
1951: (3): Sadashiva Tripathy (Congress) and Mudi Naik (Congress)

2019 Election Result

BJD candidate Sadashiv Pradhani defeats BJP's Gouri Shankar Majhi.

2014 Election Result
In 2014 election, Biju Janata Dal candidate Manohar Randhari defeated Indian National Congress candidate Sadan Nayak by a margin of 11,389 votes.

2009 Election Result
In 2009 election, Biju Janata Dal candidate Manohar Randhari defeated Indian National Congress candidate Sadan Nayak by a margin of 3,334 votes.

Notes

References

Assembly constituencies of Odisha
Nabarangpur district